Saint Charles is an unincorporated community in Coweta County, in the U.S. state of Georgia.

History
A post office called Saint Charles was established in 1891, and remained in operation until 1934. The Georgia General Assembly incorporated Saint Charles as a town in 1893. The town's municipal charter was repealed in 1995.

References

Former municipalities in Georgia (U.S. state)
Unincorporated communities in Georgia (U.S. state)
Unincorporated communities in Coweta County, Georgia
Populated places disestablished in 1995